Anonas station is an elevated Manila Light Rail Transit (LRT) station situated on Line 2. It is located in Cubao in Quezon City and is named because of its location near Anonas Street.

The station is the ninth station for trains headed to Antipolo and the fifth station for trains headed to Recto.

Anonas station was temporarily closed due to a fire which affected two rectifiers of the train line between Anonas and Katipunan stations on October 3, 2019. The station was reopened on January 22, 2021 after repairs to the rectifiers were completed.

Nearby landmarks
The most recognizable landmark that the station is located at is Saint Joseph Parish, Saint Joseph Catholic School just within the Church grounds, World Citi Medical Center, Technological Institute of the Philippines, Anson Supermart, Hi-Top Supermart, and Anonas City Center which houses Cinema 76 and a Family Mart convenience store.

Transportation links
Buses, taxis, jeepneys, tricycles, and cycle rickshaws can be used to navigate the area. Buses and jeepneys ply the Anonas Avenue and Aurora Boulevard routes. Commuters bound for Project 4 must use the southern exit, must walk towards Hi-Top Supermart and National College of Business and Arts–Cubao in Project 4, Quezon City. A tricycle terminal will be seen near Hi-Top Supermart that will bring the commuters to their desired destinations.

See also
Manila Light Rail Transit System Line 2

References

Manila Light Rail Transit System stations
Railway stations opened in 2003
Buildings and structures in Quezon City